Allan Arigoni (born 4 November 1998) is a Swiss professional footballer who plays as a rightback for FC Lugano in the Swiss Super League.

Professional career
On 18 August 2017, Arigoni signed a professional contract with Grasshopper. Arigoni made his professional debut for Grasshopper in a 1-0 Swiss Super League win over FC Zürich on 25 February 2018. He stayed with the club following their relegation in 2019 and was instrumental to the club achieving promotion back to the top flight in 2021.

Back in the Swiss Super League, he was one of the few players who remained in the starting lineup from their promotion season. Despite this, following the 2021-22 season, he chose to not renew his contract with Grasshoppers. On 22 June 2022, he returned to his native Ticino, signing a three year contract with cup champions FC Lugano.

International career
Arigoni was born in Zürich, Switzerland to a Swiss father from Ticino, and a Jamaican mother. He is a youth international for Switzerland.

References

External links
 Soccerway Profile
 SFL Profile
 GCZ Profile
 SFV U18 Profile
 SFV U19 Profile
 SFV U20 Profile

1998 births
Living people
Footballers from Zürich
Swiss men's footballers
Switzerland youth international footballers
Swiss people of Jamaican descent
Sportspeople of Jamaican descent
Grasshopper Club Zürich players
Swiss Super League players
Association football fullbacks